This is a list of Belgian television related events from 2007.

Events
9 March - Basketball player Pieter Loridon and his partner Daisy Croes win the second season of Sterren op de Dansvloer.
10 May - Sister singing trio Triple E win the first season of Supertalent in Vlaanderen
25 May - Dean Delannoit wins the third season of Idool.
4 June - Diana Ferrante wins the sixth and final season of Big Brother.

Debuts

Television shows

1990s
Samson en Gert (1990–present)
Familie (1991–present)
Wittekerke (1993-2008)
Thuis (1995–present)

2000s
Idool (2003-2011)
X Factor (2005-2008)
Mega Mindy (2006–present)
Sterren op de Dansvloer (2006–2013)

Ending this year
Big Brother (2000-2007)
Wizzy & Woppy (1999-2007)

Births

Deaths

See also
2007 in Belgium